The Juno Awards of 2010 honoured music industry achievements in Canada for the latter part of 2008 and for most of 2009. These ceremonies were in St. John's, Newfoundland and Labrador, Canada during the weekend ending 18 April 2010. Primary ceremonies were held at the Mile One Centre and at Prince Edward Plaza on George Street. This also marks the first time to not feature a host.

April Wine was inducted into the Canadian Music Hall of Fame, Bryan Adams received the Allan Waters Humanitarian Award for his part in numerous charitable concerts and campaigns during his career. Ross Reynolds, an original board member of the Canadian Academy of Recording Arts and Sciences and former head of Universal Music Canada received the Walt Grealis Special Achievement Award.

CARAS, the association responsible for the awards, awarded the 2010 ceremonies to the Newfoundland and Labrador capital based on a bid which included government support commitments totalling $1.5 million, half funded by the province, $250,000 from the St. John's municipal government and the remainder from the Atlantic Canada Opportunities Agency.

Events
Preliminary award-related events, known as Juno Week, began on 12 April 2010 with a launch event at the Confederation Building. Activities during this time included concerts such as JunoFest and the Juno Cup charity hockey game.

On 17 April, the Juno Fan Fare event featured artist interviews, prizes and opportunities for the public to meet musicians. However, some artists such as Alexisonfire were unable to attend when fog conditions that weekend delayed air travel into St. John's. The fog delays also cancelled some concerts the previous evening, and disrupted rehearsals for the main Sunday broadcast.

Also on that Saturday, winners in 32 Juno categories were announced at a special gala dinner at the St. John's Convention Centre. On the following day, prior to the main awards broadcast, a Songwriters' Circle concert was hosted by Dallas Green then broadcast on CBC Radio 2.

Primary ceremony 
The primary awards ceremony on 18 April 2010 was telecast by CTV from Mile One Centre and from an outdoor venue on George Street, featuring multiple hosts and presenters.

Classified began the proceedings with "Oh... Canada" from the George Street venue. Bryan Adams could not attend in person due to the air travel disruption from the Icelandic ash cloud incident; he therefore received his Allan Waters Humanitarian Award via satellite.

Other artists performing at the ceremonies broadcast were Justin Bieber, Billy Talent, Blue Rodeo, Michael Bublé, Drake, Great Lake Swimmers, K'naan with Young Artists for Haiti, Metric and Johnny Reid.

Award presenters and personalities included:

 Musicians Barenaked Ladies, Jully Black, Jarvis Church, Terri Clark, Alex Cuba, Amelia Curran, deadmau5, Lights, Damhnait Doyle, Danny Fernandes, Great Big Sea, Dallas Green, Hedley, Carly Rae Jepsen, Shiloh, Stereos, Kim Stockwood, The Trews, Nikki Yanofsky
 Barry Stock (Three Days Grace), hosted April Wine's induction to the Canadian Music Hall of Fame
 Alexandre Bilodeau and Jon Montgomery (2010 Winter Olympics gold medallists)
 Television personalities Luther Brown (judge, So You Think You Can Dance Canada), Leah Miller (eTalk), Seamus O'Regan (Canada AM)
 James Moore (Minister of Canadian Heritage and Official Languages)

The following seven categories were awarded during the main broadcast:

 Album of the Year
 Fan Choice Award
 Group of the Year
 New Artist of the Year
 Rap Recording of the Year
 Single of the Year
 Songwriter of the Year

Rebroadcasts of the Juno Awards telecast were scheduled for A, Bravo!, MuchMore, Star! in late April.

Changes to nomination categories for 2010
Changes were made to the following award categories for this year's nominations:

 Country Album of the Year – formerly known as Country Recording of the Year, this category is now limited to complete albums and single songs may no longer be nominated.
 Music DVD of the Year and Vocal Jazz Album of the Year – voting on these categories is now fully conducted by appointed juries, with the winners no longer voted by the overall CARAS membership.
 Pop Album of the Year and Rock Album of the Year – nominees for these categories are now determined according to an equal weighting of sales figures and jury vote. Winners are still voted on by the overall CARAS membership.
 CD/DVD Artwork of the Year: This category is now called Recording Package of the Year to indicate that other product formats such as vinyl LPs may be considered for nomination.

Nominees and winners
Nominees in the following categories were announced on 3 March 2010. Michael Bublé received the most nominations of any artist this year, represented in six categories and winning four of those (Album of the Year, Fan Choice Award, Pop Album of the Year and Single of the Year). Billy Talent, Drake and Johnny Reid each received four nominations. Drake, who had yet to release a full album, won in two categories (New Artist of the Year and Rap Recording of the Year). K'Naan also won two of his nominations (Artist of the Year and Songwriter of the Year).

Winners of most categories were announced on 17 April at a gala dinner.

Artist of the Year 

Winner: K'Naan

Other Nominees:
 Jann Arden
 Michael Bublé
 Diana Krall
 Johnny Reid

Group of the Year

Winner: Metric

Other nominees:
 Billy Talent
 Blue Rodeo
 Hedley
 The Tragically Hip

New Artist of the Year 

Winner: Drake

Other nominees:
 Justin Bieber
 Danny Fernandes
 Carly Rae Jepsen
 Shiloh

New Group of the Year 

Winner: Arkells

Other Nominees:
 Down With Webster
 The New Cities
 Stereos
 Ten Second Epic

Jack Richardson Producer of the Year

Winner: Bob Rock, "Haven't Met You Yet" and "Baby (You've Got What It Takes)" (Michael Bublé, Crazy Love)

Other Nominees:
 Kevin Churko, "Look Where You're Walking" (Modern Science Mimortl, Modern Science, produced with Kane Churko); "The Dream" (In This Moment, The Dream)
 David Foster, "Cry Me A River" and "All of Me"  (Michael Bublé, Crazy Love)
 Fred St-Gelais, "Plaisirs amers" and "C'est moi" (Marie-Mai, Version 3.0)
 Michael Phillip Wojewoda "Palm Trees" and "The Key (Different Than I Used To Be)" (Jennifer LFO, Songs from the Alien Beacon, produced with Jennifer Foster)

Recording Engineer of the Year

Winner: Dan Brodbeck, "Apple of My Eye" and "Be Careful" (Dolores O’Riordan, No Baggage)

Other Nominees:
 John Bailey, "I Can't Make You Love Me" (Sophie Milman, Take Love Easy); "Havana City" (Hilario Durán, Motion)
 Jon Drew, "Oh! The Boss Is Coming!" and "Pullin' Punches" (Arkells, Jackson Square)
 Darryl Neudorf, "And When You Wake Up" (Blue Rodeo, The Things We Left Behind); "Fever" (Neko Case, Middle Cyclone)
 Denis Tougas, "Save Your Love" and "The Mad Mile" (Kirsten Jones, The Mad Mile)

Songwriter of the Year

Winner: K'naan – "Wavin' Flag" (written with B. Mars, P. Lawrence and J. Daval), "Take A Minute", "If Rap Gets Jealous" (written with Gerald Eaton and Brian West) (K'naan, Troubadour)

Other nominees:
 Michael Bublé – "Haven’t Met You Yet", "Hold On" (written with Alan Chang and Amy S. Foster) (Michael Bublé, Crazy Love)
 Emily Haines and James Shaw – "Gimme Sympathy", "Sick Muse", "Help I’m Alive" (Metric, Fantasies)
 Carly Rae Jepsen and Ryan Stewart – "Tug of War", "Bucket", "Money and the Ego" (Carly Rae Jepsen, Tug of War)
 Joel Plaskett – "Through & Through & Through", "Deny, Deny, Deny", "All The Way Down The Line" (Joel Plaskett, Three)

Fan Choice Award 

Winner: Michael Bublé

Other nominees:

 Maxime Landry
 Nickelback
 Johnny Reid
 Ginette Reno

Nominated albums

Album of the Year 
Winner: Crazy Love – Michael Bublé

Other nominees:
 Billy Talent III – Billy Talent
 Quiet Nights – Diana Krall
 Dance with Me – Johnny Reid
 My World – Justin Bieber

Aboriginal Recording of the Year 
Winner: We Are... – Digging Roots

Other Nominees:
 Distant Morning Star – Digawolf
 Sing Soul Girl – Inez Jasper
 Swagger – Lucie Idlout
 Trail of Tears – Wayne Lavallee

Adult Alternative Album of the Year 
Winner: Three – Joel Plaskett

Other Nominees:
 How to Fall Down in Public – Howie Beck
 Masters of the Burial – Amy Millan
 Nineteen Seventy-Seven – 1977
 Way Down Here – Cuff the Duke

Alternative Album of the Year 
Winner: Fantasies – Metric

Other Nominees:
 Face Control – Handsome Furs
 I Can Wonder What You Did with Your Day – Julie Doiron
 Post-Nothing – Japandroids
 Sainthood – Tegan & Sara

Blues Album of the Year 
Winner: The Corktown Sessions – Jack de Keyzer

Other Nominees:
 From the Water – Colin Linden
 I Need a Hat – Downchild
 Low Fidelity – Treasa Levasseur
 Steady Movin – Carlos del Junco

 Recording Package of the Year Winner: Martin Bernard, Stéphane Cocke, Thomas Csano: Beats on Canvas, Beats on CanvasOther Nominees: Thomas Csano, Alex McLean: Wooden Arms, Patrick Watson
 Rachelle Dupere, Derek Henderson, Evan Kaminsky: Masters of the Burial, Amy Millan
 Alex Durlak: Potential Things, Canaille
 Justin Ellsworth, Vanessa Heins, Daniel Romano, Ken Reaume: Bring Me Your Love (special edition), City and Colour

 Children's Album of the Year Winner: Love My New Shirt – Norman FooteOther Nominees: Action Packed – Bobs and Lolo
 I'm Me! – Charlie Hope
 Walk On – The Kerplunks
 We Share The Earth – The Bee's Knees

 Contemporary Christian/Gospel Album of the Year Winner: Where's Our Revolution – Matt BrouwerOther Nominees: Dear Diary – FM Static
 Devotion – Steve Bell
 Welcome to the Masquerade – Thousand Foot Krutch
 What I Gotta Say – Janelle

 Classical Album of the Year (large ensemble) Winner: Mathieu, Shostakovich, Mendelssohn: Concertino & Concertos – Alain Lefèvre & London Mozart PlayersOther Nominees: Bartók – Les Violons du Roy
 Bruckner 8 – Yannick Nézet-Séguin & Orchestre Métropolitain
 Mendelssohn – Piano Concertos 1 & 2 – Symphony No. 5 – Louis Lortie and Orchestre symphonique de Québec
 Selections From the 2009 National Tour – National Youth Orchestra of Canada

 Classical Album of the Year (solo or chamber ensemble) Winner: Joel Quarrington: Garden Scene – Joel QuarringtonOther Nominees: El Dorado – Caroline Leonardelli
 James Ehnes plays Paganini 24 Caprices – James Ehnes
 Philip Glass : Portrait – Angèle Dubeau & La Pietà
 Tchaikovsky: Souvenir de Florence, Quartet No. 1 – I Musici de Montréal

 Classical Album of the Year (vocal or choral performance) Winner: Adrianne Pieczonka sings Puccini – Adrianne PieczonkaOther Nominees: Gomidas Songs – Isabel Bayrakdarian
 Melodiya: Glinka, Mussorgsky, Rachmaninov, Tchaikovsky – Orchestre Radio-Canada Musique
 Porpora Arias – Karina Gauvin
 Songs By Ravel – Gerald Finley

 Francophone Album of the Year Winner: Les sentinelles dorment – Andrea LindsayOther Nominees: Dans mon corps – Les Trois Accords
 Mille excuses milady – Jean Leloup
 Un serpent sous ses fleurs – Yann Perreau
 Un toi dans ma tête – Luc de Larochellière

 Instrumental Album of the Year Winner: As Seen Through Windows – Bell OrchestreOther Nominees: Beats on Canvas – Beats on Canvas
 L'île de Sept Villes – The Hylozoists
 Trifecta – Pavlo, Rik Emmett and Oscar Lopez
 Yalla Yalla! – Sultans of String

 International Album of the Year Winner: Only by the Night – Kings of LeonOther Nominees: Circus – Britney Spears
 The E.N.D – The Black Eyed Peas
 Fearless – Taylor Swift
 I Dreamed a Dream – Susan Boyle

 Contemporary Jazz Album of the Year Winner: The Happiness Project – Charles SpearinOther Nominees: Infernal Machines – Darcy James Argue's Secret Society
 Motion – Hilario Durán
 Silverbirch – John Roney with the Silver Birch String Quartet
 Songbook Vol. 1 – Kirk MacDonald Quartet

 Traditional Jazz Album of the Year Winner: It's About Time – Terry ClarkeOther Nominees: Bluesy Lunedi – Alain Bédard
 Pleased To Meet You – Oliver Jones and Hank Jones
 Regeneration – Al Henderson Septet
 Strands II – Darren Sigesmund

 Vocal Jazz Album of the Year Winner: Ranee Lee Lives Upstairs – Ranee LeeOther Nominees: Haven't We Met? – Emilie-Claire Barlow
 I Like Men – Carol Welsman
 Lovelight – Michael Kaeshammer
 Quiet Nights – Diana Krall

 Pop Album of the Year Winner: Crazy Love – Michael BubléOther Nominees: The Listening – LIGHTS
 My World – Justin Bieber
 The Show Must Go – Hedley
 Stereos – Stereos

 Rock Album of the Year Winner: Billy Talent III – Billy TalentOther Nominees: Dark Horse – Nickelback
 Life Starts Now – Three Days Grace
 Old Crows/Young Cardinals – Alexisonfire
 We Are The Same – The Tragically Hip

 Roots and Traditional Album of the Year (Solo) Winner: Hunter, Hunter, Amelia CurranOther Nominees: Achin in Yer Bones, Romi Mayes
 Losin' Lately Gambler, Corb Lund
 Pink Strat, Bahamas
 Queen’s Hotel, John Wort Hannam

 Roots and Traditional Album of the Year (Group) Winner: The Good Lovelies, The Good LoveliesOther Nominees: Annie Lou, Annie Lou
 Let's Just Stay Here, Carolyn Mark and NQ Arbuckle
 Lost Channels, Great Lake Swimmers
 No Fool for Trying, Madison Violet

 World Music Album of the Year Winner: Comfortably Mine, Dominic MancusoOther Nominees: Alex Cuba, Alex Cuba
 La danse de l’exilé, Karim Saada
 Slide to Freedom 2: Make a Better World, Doug Cox Salil Bhatt and Cassius Khan
 Sunplace, Jaffa Road

Nominated releases

 Single of the Year Winner: "Haven't Met You Yet" – Michael BubléOther Nominees: "Anybody Listening" – Classified
 "Best I Ever Had" – Drake
 "Love Is a First" – The Tragically Hip
 "Rusted from the Rain" – Billy Talent

 Classical Composition of the Year Winner: "Lament in the Trampled Garden", Marjan Mozetich (album, Lament in the Trampled Garden)Other Nominees: "Angels in Flight", Marjan Mozetich (album, Lament in the Trampled Garden)
 "Dreams of Flying", Rob Teehan (performed by National Youth Orchestra of Canada)
 "Earth Songs", Stephen Chatman (album, Earth Songs)
 "Nocturne", Leonard Enns (DaCapo Chamber Choir album, Shadowland)

 Country Album of the Year Winner: Dance With Me, Johnny ReidOther Nominees: Believe, Emerson Drive
 Go, Doc Walker
 The Long Way Home, Terri Clark
 The Road Hammers II, The Road Hammers

 Dance Recording of the Year Winner: For Lack of a Better Name, Deadmau5Other Nominees: I'm No Human, Misstress Barbara
 "Runnin", Doman and Gooding with Dru and Lincoln
 "Shine 4U", Carmen and Camille
 Thunderheist, Thunderheist

 Music DVD of the Year Winner: Iron Maiden: Flight 666 (Iron Maiden), Stefan Demetriou, Sam Dunn, Scott McFadyen, Rod Smallwood, Andy TaylorOther Nominees: Acoustic – Friends & Total Strangers (The Trews), John-Angus MacDonald, Tim Martin, Larry Wanagas
 Drum! Live (Drum!), Daniel Brooker, Brookes Diamond, Doris Mason, Colin Smeltzer, Aaron Young
 Miroir Noir (Arcade Fire), Arcade Fire, Vincent Morisset
 Snakes & Arrows Live (Rush), Pegi Cecconi, Ray Danniels, François Lamoureaux, Pierre Lamoureaux, Allan Weinrib

 R&B/Soul Recording of the Year Winner: "Lonesome Highway", JacksoulOther Nominees: The Black Book, Jully Black
 The Bridge, Melanie Fiona
 Intro, Danny Fernandes
 The Long Way Home, Jarvis Church

 Rap Recording of the Year Winner: So Far Gone, DrakeOther nominees: Self Explanatory, Classified
 "I'm Still Fly", Big Page, Drake & U.G.O Crew
 Troubadour, K'naan
 Yes!, k-os

 Reggae Recording of the Year Winner: Gonna Be Alright, Dubmatix with Prince BlancoOther Nominees: American Dream, Carl Henry
 Breaking Up, Tanya Mullings
 Show Me The Way, Kim Davis
 Wha-La-La-Leng, Ghislain Poirier with Face-T

 Video of the Year Winner: "Little Bit of Red" – Serena RyderOther Nominees:'
 "Anybody Listening" – Classified
 "Heavens to Purgatory" – The Most Serene Republic
 "It's Okay" – Land of Talk
 "Mr. Hurricane" – Beast

Compilation album
A compilation album featuring selected Juno nominees was released on 30 March 2010 by Sony Music Entertainment Canada. Sales of the album support the CARAS music education charity MusiCounts. The artists and track listing is as follows:
 "Haven’t Met You Yet", Michael Bublé
 "Wavin' Flag", K'naan
 "Burn It to the Ground", Nickelback
 "Break", Three Days Grace
 "Rusted From The Rain", Billy Talent
 "Oh, The Boss Is Coming!", Arkells
 "Gimme Sympathy", Metric
 "Dead End Countdown", The New Cities
 "Cha-Ching", Hedley
 "Anybody Listening", Classified
 "One Time", Justin Bieber
 "Rich Girl$", Down With Webster
 "Best I Ever Had", Drake
 "Summer Girl", Stereos
 "Operator (A Girl Like Me)", Shiloh
 "Love Is A First", The Tragically Hip
 "A Million Miles Away", Jann Arden
 "Arizona Dust", Blue Rodeo
 "A Woman Like You", Johnny Reid
 "Walk on By", Diana Krall

See also
 Juno Awards of 2002, the first and previous Juno Awards to be hosted in St. John's

References

External links
 Juno Awards official site
 Ruckus on the Edge – 2010 Juno – Newfoundland host committee site

2010
2010 in Canadian music
2010 music awards
April 2010 events in Canada
2010 in Newfoundland and Labrador
Music festivals in St. John's, Newfoundland and Labrador